Alber & Geiger is a political lobbying agency and a European-based government relations law firm, lobbying the EU institutions in Brussels. The firm has also a litigation practice at the European Court of Justice and has offices in Brussels, Berlin, Beijing and Washington D.C.

Among the firm's partners are the former Advocate General of the European Court of Justice and Vice President of the European Parliament Siegbert Alber, the former Secretary General of the European Commission, Carlo Trojan, the former Albanian Prime Minister Fatos Nano, Guus Houttuin from the European External Action Service and Gustaaf Borchardt from the European Commission.

The firm was founded in 2007 as a spin-off of leading US lobbying firm Cassidy & Associates by its former European CEO Andreas Geiger. Before that, Geiger was Head of the EU Law Center of Ernst & Young in Brussels and attorney at the law firm Taylor Wessing. He wrote a handbook on EU lobbying.

Besides lobbying for corporate clients the firm represents foreign governments. Alber & Geiger received media attention for representing the Bulgarian government on EU funds and the Moroccan government on free trade agreements regarding the Western Sahara, India, but also the political opposition of Iran and former government members of Ukraine, Azerbaijan and Serbia. Alber & Geiger have also represented cases on the violation of EU standards of Poland and Moldova. They represented Panama regarding blacklisting on the EU money laundry list for the Panama Papers.

Some of their corporate cases include winning against Microsoft before the EU Commission in the EU "browser war", representing Huawei and Xiaomi on the EU data security issue, Teflon producer Chemours on EU chemical policies, and Piraeus Bank regarding the financial crisis in Greece. They represented Terna building the E65 in Greece and Australian agro company Nufarm on EU biofuel policy under the Green Deal and worked on the EU plastic bag ban as well as on the state monopolies for gambling in the EU. They further represented American energy interests in the Balkans against Russian influence and a US real estate corporation on a Mexican project toward German Bad Bank FMS Wertmanagement.

Controversy
In June 2012, the Bureau of Investigative Journalism and The Independent, a leading UK newspaper, revealed how senior members of the House of Lords failed to disclose their business interests in a public inquiry. On Lord Plumb's entry in the register of interests he lists his only renumerated employment/profession as 'farming' despite his involvement with the Brussels-based lobbying firm Alber and Geiger since 2007.
According to The Independent, Lord Plumb insists, he did not need to register his involvement because he had never been in employment, paid or unpaid by the firm which is typically the case in law firms with non-executive senior members.

References

https://www.zdf.de/dokumentation/zdfinfo-doku/die-unsichtbare-macht-lobby-republik-deutschland-102.html
http://blog.wiwo.de/management/2017/03/24/buchauszug-markus-balseruwe-ritzer-lobbykratie-wie-die-wirtschaft-sich-einfluss-mehrheiten-gesetze-kauft/

External links
 Alber & Geiger Web site

Lobbying firms